Lelystad is a municipality and a city in the centre of the Netherlands, and it is the capital of the province of Flevoland. The city, built on reclaimed land, was founded in 1967 and was named after Cornelis Lely, who engineered the Afsluitdijk, making the reclamation possible.

History
Lelystad is built on the seabed of the former Zuiderzee. About 6500 years ago this wetland was above high tide level and inhabited; the Netherlands have steadily subsided since. Near Lelystad at Swifterbant, the oldest human skeletons in Western Europe were discovered. Due to rising water levels and storms, the peatlands were washed away, and the Lacus Flevo (in Roman times) grew to be the Almere (Middle Ages) and became the Zuiderzee. The Zuiderzee (Southern Sea) was the main transport route from Amsterdam to the North Sea and the Hanseatic League cities. Due to the many shipwrecks in Flevoland, Lelystad now houses the National Centre for Maritime History, with a museum and the shipyard that has built the Batavia replica.

After the Second World War the Zuiderzee Works continued, constructing the polder of Eastern Flevoland. In 1950 work commenced on several construction islands in the middle of the IJsselmeer. Lelystad-Haven was the largest island, and its wooden barracks housed a community of dyke-builders. In 1955 they reached the mainland, which made it possible to drive to Lelystad by car. One of the three pumping stations, which drained the polder in June 1957, was the diesel-powered Wortman in Lelystad-Haven. Until 1967 the only inhabitants of Lelystad were technical engineers and laborers and superintendents, living on the former construction island.

Demographics

Ethnic composition  
65% is of Dutch background (two parents born in the Netherlands)
23% non western migration background (one or two parents born in a non-western country)
12% western migration background (one or two parents born in a western country)
Lelystad has a big Surinamese population (5225 people), most of the people with a non western background live in the east of the city. Lelystad also has significant Turkish (2278 people) and Moroccan(2615 people) communities, most of which live in the northeastern part of the city. There were 2059 people with an Antillian background living in the city.

Climate

Landscape

Lelystad is the largest municipality in the Netherlands in area, but a large part of that area is water: Markermeer and IJsselmeer. Another major area is the internationally famous nature park of Oostvaardersplassen, which arose naturally when the polder of South Flevoland was drained. Lelystad is also surrounded by a square of woodlands and parks and flat farmland. The importance of the landscape and sky is emphasized by several pieces of land art: engineers' work and works such as the Observatorium by Robert Morris (see below).

The artificial islands of Marker Wadden lie immediately to the northwest of Lelystad. Construction started in 2016, and the first islands have already become important wildlife sites, with many species of birds coming to the islands during the breeding season.

Tourism
Lelystad has several tourist attractions, including:
 The replica of the 17th-century ship Batavia at the Batavia Shipyard
 Batavia Stad Fashion Outlet
 Hanzestad Compagnie, a fleet of historical sailing ships
 Lelystad Nature Park
 National Aviation Theme Park Aviodrome
 Modern architecture, for example the Zilverparkkade and Agora Theatre

Lelystad hosts many one-day events like the Lelystad Airshow, the Water Festival, the National Old Timer Day, Lelystad Speedway, Architecture day and several sports events. On the Midland Circuit many motor, kart and stock car racing events and several autoclub meetings are held. On the coast there are several marinas.

Transport
Lelystad can be reached by air, water, and land.

Air
Lelystad Airport is the biggest general aviation airport in the Netherlands. It is owned wholly by Schiphol Group. Lelystad Airport has undergone major expansion, including the construction of a passenger terminal for commercial flights, as well as an extension of the runway. The original plan for this airport was to become the main gateway for passengers into the country, to eleviate some of the pressure from Schiphol Airport in Amsterdam. In turn, Schiphol would be able to focus on its role as international hub for lay-overs. Although the expansion of Lelystad Airport has been finished, the airport has not yet opened for passengers due to various political reasons. As of 2022, the government has decided to delay the opening of the terminals with at least two years, and even then the opening will not be guaranteed.

Water
Lelystad has a small inland port, several marinas, and a canal system which also functions to aid in managing the water levels in the rest of the polder. The canal system connects to the Markermeer with a lock to the southwest of Lelystad, and connects the city and its industrial areas to all other towns and their respective industrial areas in the polder.

Rail
the Weesp–Lelystad railway (Flevolijn) extends south from Lelystad Centrum railway station and connects the city with Almere, and to the Randstad region beyond. The Lelystad–Zwolle railway (Hanzelijn) extends north from Lelystad and connects it with Dronten, Kampen and Zwolle.

Motorway
The A6 motorway runs along Lelystad on the eastern side of the city. There are three on-ramps connecting this motorway to Lelystad, allowing traffic to travel northbound to Emmeloord and the province of Friesland, or southbound to Almere and the Randstad region.

Provincial roads
The N302 provincial road connects Lelystad to the south-east with Harderwijk and the province of Gelderland beyond. The N307 connects Lelystad across the Houtribdijk to Enkhuizen and the province of North Holland beyond, and to Dronten and beyond that to Kampen in the province of Overijssel. The N309 connects Lelystad to Dronten and beyond that to Elburg in the province of Gelderland.

Shield and flag
The honeycomb grid in the arms of Lelystad represents the dykes, built with six-edged concrete or basalt blocks. The colour gold indicates the high costs of the project of making the polder. The centre shield is the arms of engineer Cornelis Lely. The sealions reflect the history of the land.

In the flag, the fleur-de-lis (lily) again takes a central point, referring to the name Lely. The yellow background reflects the precious land, and the blue lines the dykes and waterways. The flag of the province is similarly adorned with the fleur-de-lis to commemorate Lely.

Notable residents

 Abraham Bueno de Mesquita (1918–2005) comedian and actor
 Nancy van Overveldt (1930-2015), artist
 Hans Gruijters (1931–2005), politician and journalist
 Hubert Fermina (1948-2022), nurse and politician
 Michiel van Hulten (born 1969), former politician and MEP (1999–2004)
 Edsilia Rombley (born 1978), singer
 Rianne ten Haken (born 1986), a Dutch model

Sport 

 Co Stompé (born 1962), retired professional darts player
 Aron Winter (born 1967), retired footballer and football manager
 Ivan Sokolov (born 1968), Bosnian chess grand-master
 Chiel Warners (born 1978), former decathlete
 Charles Zwolsman Jr. (born 1979), racing car driver
 Karin Ruckstuhl (born 1980), former heptathlete
 Guido van der Valk (born 1980), professional golfer
 Ruben Schaken (born 1982), football player
 Niels de Ruiter (born 1983), former Dutch darts player, current director of the Dutch Darts Federation
 Thijs van Valkengoed (born 1983), breaststroke swimmer, competed at the 2004 and the 2008 Summer Olympics
 Boy Waterman (born 1984), football goalkeeper
 Daan Brandenburg (born 1987), chess grandmaster 
 Nathaniël Will (born 1989), footballer
 Alex Vlaar (born 1996), a Bulgarian badminton player
 Devyne Rensch (born 2003), football player for AFC Ajax and the Netherlands national football team

Twin city
Lelystad maintains international relations with the Suriname twin city of Lelydorp.

References

External links

Official website

 
Cities in the Netherlands
Municipalities of Flevoland
Populated places in Flevoland
Populated places established in 1967
Provincial capitals of the Netherlands
1967 establishments in the Netherlands